Portrait of Winckelmann is a 1764 painting by Angelica Kauffmann. It was produced in Rome and shows the notable archaeologist and art historian Johann Joachim Winckelmann reading from a book, which is resting on a bas-relief showing the Three Graces. It is signed at the lower right by the artist and is now in the Kunsthaus Zürich.

Bibliography 
 Bettina Baumgärtel, Angelika Kauffmann, Ostfildern, Hatje, 1998, 
 Tobias G. Natter, Angelica Kauffmann, Hatje Cantz, Ostfildern, 2007, 

Winckelmann
1764 paintings
Paintings by Angelica Kauffman